"Kinda Girl You Are" is a song by English indie rock band Kaiser Chiefs, taken from their fourth studio album The Future Is Medieval (2011). It was released in the United Kingdom as a digital download on 28 October 2011.

Music video
A music video to accompany the release of "Kinda Girl You Are" was first released onto YouTube on 1 November 2011 at a total length of two minutes and fifty-one seconds. It depicts the antics of a girl gang consisting of lookalikes of Beyoncé, Lady Gaga, and Britney Spears. The band members are featured only briefly, in a car that stops next to the car the three women are in.

Track listing

Release history

References

2011 singles
Kaiser Chiefs songs
Songs written by Nick Hodgson
Songs written by Ricky Wilson (British musician)
Songs written by Simon Rix
Songs written by Andrew White (musician)
Songs written by Nick "Peanut" Baines
2011 songs
Polydor Records singles